Benjamin Chase Harper (born October 28, 1969) is an American singer-songwriter and multi-instrumentalist. Harper plays an eclectic mix of blues, folk, soul, reggae, and rock music and is known for his guitar-playing skills, vocals, live performances, and activism. He has released twelve studio albums, mostly through Virgin Records, and has toured internationally.

Harper is a three-time Grammy Award winner and seven-time nominee, with awards for Best Pop Instrumental Performance and Best Traditional Soul Gospel Album in 2004 and Best Blues Album in 2013.

At the 40th Blues Music Awards ceremony, Harper's joint composition with Charlie Musselwhite, "No Mercy in This Land", was named Song of the Year.

Early life
Harper was born in Pomona, California. His late father, Leonard Harper, was of African-American and Cherokee ancestry, and his mother, Ellen Harper Verdries ( Chase), is Jewish. His maternal great-grandmother was a Russian-Lithuanian Jew. His parents divorced when he was five years old, and he grew up with his mother's family. Harper has two brothers, Joel and Peter Harper.

Harper began playing guitar as a child. His maternal grandparents' music store, the Folk Music Center and Museum, laid a foundation of folk and blues for the artist, complemented by regular patrons Leonard Cohen, Taj Mahal, John Darnielle, and David Lindley and quotes of William Shakespeare and Robert Frost made often by his grandfather.

In 1978, at the age of 9, Harper attended Bob Marley's performance in Burbank, California, where Marley was joined by former bandmate Peter Tosh for the encore. It was, according to Harper, an important influence.

Career
At the age of twelve, Harper played his first gig. During the 1980s, in his teen years, Harper began to play the slide guitar, mimicking the style of Robert Johnson. Harper refined his style, taking up the Weissenborn slide guitar.  Harper escaped from the Inland Empire after being offered an invitation by Taj Mahal to tour with the artist. They recorded Taj Mahal's album Follow the Drinking Gourd, released in November 1990, and toured Hawaii.
In 1992, Harper recorded the LP Pleasure and Pain with folk multi-instrumentalist Tom Freund. After this limited-edition record, Harper secured a lifetime record deal with Virgin Records, which released his debut album, Welcome to the Cruel World, in 1994. This allowed him to be invited to the Rencontres Trans Musicales of Rennes in France in December 1993 where he went up on a large stage for the first time. His first album was followed by Fight For Your Mind in 1995, with Juan Nelson on bass, which became a college radio favorite and included several songs that Harper still plays live regularly.

In 1999, at the Santa Barbara Bowl, Harper met Jack Johnson and sent a demo tape of Johnson's songs to his producer, J. P. Plunier, who then produced Johnson's first album, Brushfire Fairytales, in December 2000. Jack Johnson became the opening act in late February 2001 for the last 23 cities of Ben Harper's “Innocent Criminals” tour of the United States.

Early in Harper's career, his music received more attention in Europe and was widely played in Australia (first on Triple J radio). Harper has made comments on a number of occasions that his career was kicked off in Australia. While he was a well-known and respected figure in the United States, he was also a star in countries like Australia, New Zealand, France, Portugal, Germany, Switzerland and the Netherlands, receiving a great deal of airplay and critical acclaim. His popularity in Europe became wide enough that he was French Rolling Stone magazine's Artist of the Year (Artiste De L'Année) in 2003, and his Australian tour that year for Diamonds on the Inside was highly successful with record sales.

In 2002, Harper was one of the featured singers covering Motown hits by Marvin Gaye in the documentary, Standing in the Shadows of Motown (a history of The Funk Brothers). Harper was featured on the album True Love by Toots and the Maytals, which won the Grammy Award in 2004 for Best Reggae Album, and showcased many notable musicians including Willie Nelson, Eric Clapton, Jeff Beck, Trey Anastasio, Gwen Stefani / No Doubt, Bonnie Raitt, Manu Chao, The Roots, Ryan Adams, Keith Richards, Toots Hibbert, Paul Douglas, Jackie Jackson, Ken Boothe, and The Skatalites.

On April 3, 2004, Harper and Jack Johnson performed with Toots and the Maytals on Saturday Night Live (season 29, episode 16), a show hosted by Donald Trump.

In October 2004, Harper participated in the Vote for Change concert tour organized to benefit Moveon.org and encourage people in the swing states to vote during the 2004 U.S. presidential election. In the same month, Harper contributed a live recording of the song "Oppression" to For The Lady, a benefit album for jailed Nobel Peace Prize winner and Burmese pro-democracy advocate Aung San Suu Kyi. In 2006, Harper released the double album Both Sides of the Gun which debuted at number 7 on the Billboard 200. Though uncredited, he appears briefly in the 2006 David Lynch film Inland Empire, alongside his wife Laura Dern.

Harper is part of the No Nukes group which is against the expansion of nuclear power. In 2007 the group recorded a music video of a new version of the Buffalo Springfield song "For What It's Worth". Harper's collaboration "Boa Sorte/Good Luck" with Brazilian singer Vanessa da Mata peaked at #1 in Brazil and Portugal. In Brazil it also won a highly coveted Prêmio Multishow for "Best Song" in 2008. Also in 2008, Harper participated in the benefit album Songs for Tibet.

On August 27, 2010, it was reported that Harper had formed a band called Fistful of Mercy with Dhani Harrison and Joseph Arthur. Fistful of Mercy released their debut record, As I Call You Down, on October 5, 2010.

On May 17, 2011, Harper's official site posted that his next album was released, entitled Give Till It's Gone. The album is a continuation of recording with Relentless7.

On October 1, 2012, a new album from Harper with Charlie Musselwhite was announced entitled Get Up! on Stax Records / Concord Music Group. The official release date for the album was January 29, 2013. Get Up! was recorded in Los Angeles and produced by Harper. It is Harper's 12th studio album and first new recording since 2011's Give Till It's Gone (Virgin).

In December 2012, it was announced that Harper had co-produced lead vocalist Natalie Maines of the Dixie Chicks first solo rock album Mother. It was released on May 7, 2013.

In early 2015, it was announced that Harper and The Innocent Criminals would perform at the Boston Calling Music Festival in May 2015.
Ben Harper and The Innocent Criminals performed at Rock Werchter Festival 2015 on June 28, 2015.

Harper has five albums and one single that have been certified Gold by the RIAA: Welcome The Cruel World/Virgin, Burn To Shine/Virgin, Fight For Your Mind/Virgin, Live From Mars/Virgin, Diamonds On The Inside/Capitol-Virgin and You Found Another Lover/Stax (single)

On February 12, 2016, Harper released (as a YouTube video) his new single "Call It What It Is", the first track taken from his upcoming new studio album Call It What It Is due for release on April 8, 2016.

On April 8, 2019, Harper performed as a guest artist on the seventeenth season of American Idol during the second night of the “Top 20 Duets” episode. Harper sang with contestant Alejandro Aranda, playing "There Will Be a Light".

At the 40th Blues Music Awards ceremony, Harper's joint composition with Charlie Musselwhite, "No Mercy In This Land", was named as 'Song of the Year'.

On March 20, 2019, Mavis Staples announced a new album We Get By, featuring eleven tracks written and produced by Harper. The title track, which features Harper on vocals and in the music video, was released on May 15, 2019.

In 2020 Harper released Winter Is for Lovers, an album recorded with solo Monteleone lap steel songs. "It started out as an exploration of steel guitar," Harper told Acoustic Guitar magazine in a 2020 interview, "Winter Is for Lovers is written as one piece of music; let's define that in the way that the old classical guitarists would have, on a single guitar (the Monteleone lap steel)."

On June 9, 2021, Harper's longtime bassist, collaborator, and Innocent Criminals member, Juan Nelson, died at the age 62. Harper paid tribute to him, stating on Twitter: "Beloved husband, father, musical genius, BHIC band member of 27 years, and the finest man I've ever known. It's near impossible for me to put words to this pain and loss. Rest in Glory our beloved Reverend Juan." No cause of death has been confirmed.

On July 22, 2022, Harper released the album Bloodline Maintenance. The album is dedicated to the memory of Juan Nelson.

Personal life

In 1996, Harper married his first wife, Joanna. They have two children together, son Charles (born circa 1997) and daughter Harris (born circa 2000). Harper and Joanna separated in 2000, and were divorced in 2001.

Harper began dating actress Laura Dern after they met at one of his concerts in fall 2000. Harper and Dern married on December 23, 2005, at their home in Los Angeles. They have two children, son Ellery Walker (born August 2001) and daughter Jaya (born November 2004).

In October 2010, Harper filed for divorce from Dern, citing irreconcilable differences. They briefly reconciled and attended the 2012 Golden Globe Awards together, but Dern reactivated the divorce by filing a legal response in July 2012. The divorce was finalized in September 2013.

Harper married his third wife, social advocate Jaclyn Matfus, on January 1, 2015. Their son Besso was born in June 2017.

Harper is a skateboarder who has trained with Rodney Mullen and he also owns a warehouse for his personal skateboarding. Harper co-owns the skateboarding brand Roller Horror with professional skateboarder Mike York. In September 2016, Harper appeared on The Nine Club skateboard podcast, hosted by Chris Roberts, where he discussed his relationship and history with skateboarding. On The Nine Club, he also reveals that he went to school and began skateboarding with Chris Miller in Pomona, California.

Harper's cousin is Washington State Supreme Court Justice Steven Gonzalez.

Philanthropy
Harper supports Little Kids Rock, a national nonprofit organization that works to restore and revitalize music education in disadvantaged U.S. public schools. In 2013, he donated items to their San Francisco Bay Area benefit concert.

On December 11, 2016, he played an acoustic benefit concert at Bimbos in San Francisco supporting New Light India's "Boys Home Project". Founded in 2000 by Urmi Basu, New Light India provides shelter, educational opportunities, recreational facilities, healthcare and legal aid for the girls and women in Kalighat, notorious for its red light district.

Harper and his wife, Jaclyn, have been long-time supporters of International Medical Corps’ work around the world. During the COVID-19 pandemic, they supported the organization's work in California, and Harper recorded a song to benefit International Medical Corps’ global relief efforts.

Awards and nominations

Discography

Studio albums

 Welcome to the Cruel World (1994)
 Fight for Your Mind (1995)
 The Will to Live (1997)
 Burn to Shine (with The Innocent Criminals) (1999)
 Diamonds on the Inside (2003)
 There Will Be a Light (with The Blind Boys of Alabama) (2004)
 Both Sides of the Gun (2006)
 Lifeline (with The Innocent Criminals) (2007)
 White Lies for Dark Times (with Relentless7) (2009)
 Give Till It's Gone (2011)
 Get Up! (with Charlie Musselwhite) (2013)
 Childhood Home (with Ellen Harper) (2014)
 Call It What It Is (with The Innocent Criminals) (2016)
 No Mercy in This Land (with Charlie Musselwhite) (2018)
 Winter Is for Lovers (2020)
 Bloodline Maintenance (2022)

Filmography

References

External links

 
 Official Ben Harper shop
 Ben Harper International Forum
 Ben Harper Live for Earth Day on National Geographic
 Ben Harper at RollingStone.com
 
 
 

 
1969 births
Living people
20th-century African-American male singers
20th-century American guitarists
21st-century African-American male singers
21st-century American guitarists
African-American guitarists
African-American Jews
African-American male singer-songwriters
African-American record producers
African-American rock musicians
American blues guitarists
American blues singers
American folk guitarists
American folk singers
American male guitarists
American multi-instrumentalists
American people of Cherokee descent
American people of Lithuanian-Jewish descent
American people of Russian-Jewish descent
American rock guitarists
American rock singers
American rock songwriters
Dern family
Fingerstyle guitarists
Fistful of Mercy members
Grammy Award winners
Guitarists from California
Jewish American musicians
Real World Records artists
Record producers from California
Singer-songwriters from California
Slide guitarists
Steel guitarists
Virgin Records artists
Weissenborn players